Nello L. Teer Company was a privately owned General Contracting firm founded in 1909 by Nello Leguy Teer. The Nello L. Teer Company was headquartered in Durham, North Carolina and grew to be one of the largest construction companies in the world.  Koppers of Pittsburgh, Pennsylvania purchased the Nello L. Teer Company and today much of the aggregate assets are part of Lehigh Hanson - HeidelbergCement in North America, rail assets are part of CSX, the road construction aspects are held within the Colas Group, and some of the real estate management aspects were transferred to Teer Associates.

History

Research Triangle Park. The Great North Road. The Israeli Air Bases. The Blue Ridge Parkway.

Divisions

Africa Office
In 1968, the company opens an Africa Office in Dar Es Salaam, Tanzania.

Asphalt Division
In 1945, the Asphalt Division was formed to do defense work in Gulfport, Mississippi; and later highway work in North Carolina.

Building Division
The Building Division was officially launched in 1965, but it was not until 1973, The Nello Teer Company bought Romeo Guest Associates of Greensboro, a well-established industrial building firm. With 80 years of experience, Romeo Guest Associates became the Building Division of the Nello L. Teer Company without any changes in management. The experienced Guest firm built major manufacturing plants in 13 states, a distinction that added a competitive element to the Nello L. Teer Company’s newly formed Heavy and Industrial Division. Today Romeo Guest Associates, Inc., is an employee-owned company based in Durham, North Carolina.

Central American Division
In 1955, the Central American Division opens its headquarters in Guatemala City, marking the launch of Nello L. Teer International.

Central Engineering and Contracting Corporation
In 1940, Central Engineering and Contracting Corporation opens and is responsible for owning and maintaining the company’s equipment. In 1980, the company owned over 5,000 pieces of yellow iron that was located in North America, Central America, Africa, and the Middle East.

Concrete Paving Division
The Concrete paving Division was started to pave the Colonial Highway, Williamsburg, Virginia.

Dredging Division
In 1955, the Dredging Division was started with work in Florida, Virginia and later Maryland.

Durham-Southern Railway
When the Nello L. Teer Company bought the Durham and Southern Railway in 1954, it was still using steam engines. Four Baldwin 1200 Horse power Diesel Electric Locomotives were purchased in 1956 to replace the steam locomotives.

Quarry Division
The Quarry Division operated several quarries including the Crabtree Quarry in Raleigh, North Carolina. Other quarries were located in Durham, Holly Springs, New Bern, Princeton, Raleigh, Rocky Mount, and Rougemount.

Teer Enterprises
In, 1969 The Nello L. Teer Company signed a franchise agreement with Triangle Service Center, Incorporated, the for-profit arm of RTP developer Research Triangle Foundation. During the period of 1969 to 1979, the company completed the 128-room Governors Inn Hotel, 50 and 100 Park Offices. The company, in 1972, placed its real estate development assets in Teer Enterprises, Ltd. then launched the construction of 200 Park Offices and 300 Park Offices. The company started construction on 400 Park Offices in 1980 which was eventually occupied by GTE Government Systems and it then expanded Governors Inn to 203 rooms including additional meeting and lounge rooms. The Nello L. Teer Company merged with Koppers Company on August 1, 1980; however, the deal did not include Teer Enterprises. During 1982 the company began work on 500, 600, 700, and 800 Park Offices, which includes the IBM complex. Teer Enterprises was sold by the family in 1985 and management was transferred to a new company called Teer Associates.

Webster County Coal Company
In 1974, the Nello L. Teer Company added another layer to its activities by entering the coal mining industry. The company started a surface mining division called Webster County Coal Company. The coal stripping division started in West Virginia and Western Pennsylvania on property previously owned by the company and areas owned by established mining businesses. The Nello L. Teer Company brought a new angle to the coal stripping process by applying highway construction techniques to surface mining. Using conventional construction equipment, the Webster County Coal Company’s mines were producing up to 1.2 million tons of high-grade coal annually.

Some Noteworthy Projects

North America
Blue Ridge Parkway - 17 Sections including the first and last sections
Capeheart Housing Project - 849 Units (JV with H. L. Coble Construction Company) - Cherry Point, North Carolina (1959)
Capeheart Housing Project - 1500 Units (JV with H. L. Coble Construction Company & W. H. Weaver Construction Company) - Seymour Johnson Air Base
Jordan Lake Dam - North Carolina
Liggett and Myers Tobacco Company Headquarters - Durham, North Carolina
Forsyth County Hospital - Charlotte, North Carolina
Maine Turnpike - Section which ran from Portland to Augusta - Maine
Roanoke Rapids Dam - North Carolina
Duke University Chapel Excavation - Durham, North Carolina
George P. Stevenson Dam - Sinnemahoning, Pennsylvania
Cherry Point Marine Corps Air Station - Runway Construction - North Carolina
Pennsylvania Turnpike - Concrete Paving Operations near Harrisburg, Pennsylvania
Blue Cross Blue Shield Building, Chapel Hill, North Carolina
Iceland NATO Airfield - Keflavik, Iceland
Reigal Paper Plant - North Carolina
West Virginia Turnpike - Six Sections - West Virginia
Kenan Stadium - Excavation - Chapel Hill, North Carolina
Roanoke Civic Center
I-495 Maryland
Duke University Medical Center - Durham, North Carolina
Governors Inn, RTP, North Carolina
Burroughs Wellcome Headquarters - Durham, North Carolina
Wake County Courthouse - Raleigh, North Carolina
Fort Lee - Grading and paving for streets and parade grounds - Virginia
Raleigh-Durham Airport - Runway grading and paving of two perpendicular runways - North Carolina
Winston-Salem Airport - Runway grading and paving - North Carolina
Bear Creek Dam, Scranton, Pennsylvania
Seymour Johnson Air Base - Expansion for B-52 jet bombers - Goldsboro, North Carolina
Broken Bow Dam, Broken Bow, Oklahoma
Titan II Missile Base, Tucson, Arizona (JV with J.A. Jones Construction Company & Dwight W. Winkleman Construction Company)
K-2 Vienna Route Metro Subway (e.g., Clarendon Metro station), Arlington, Virginia
Smithland Dam, Kentucky (JV with J.A. Jones Construction Company)

International

Africa
Great North Road - Tanzania, Africa
Four United States air bases in Morocco, Northern Africa including Nouasseur Air Base
Atlas Constructors (A Joint Venture of Morrison-Knudsen, Nello L. Teer Company, Bates & Rogers Construction Corp., Blythe Bros. Company, and Ralph R. Mills Co., Inc.)
Dantopka-Akpakpa Bridge -  Republic of Benin, West Africa
Kamuzu International Airport - Lilongwe, Malawi

Central America
Pan-American Highway, Guatemala
Rama Road, Nicaragua

Middle East
Ramada Inn Doha, Qatar
Ramon Air Base, Israel

South America
Guri Dam - Excavation and Aggregate Production - Venezuela

References

External links
Nello L. Teer Company Historical homepage

1909 establishments in North Carolina
Companies based in Durham, North Carolina
Construction and civil engineering companies established in 1909
Construction and civil engineering companies of the United States
Privately held companies based in North Carolina